The Spring Festival is a 1991 Chinese drama film directed by Huang Jianzhong. The film was selected as the Chinese entry for the Best Foreign Language Film at the 64th Academy Awards, but was not accepted as a nominee.

Cast
 Li Baotian as Father
 Zhao Lirong as Mother
 Ding Jiali as Sister-in-law
 Ge You as Son-in-law

Awards and nominations

See also
 List of submissions to the 64th Academy Awards for Best Foreign Language Film
 List of Chinese submissions for the Academy Award for Best Foreign Language Film

References

External links
 

1991 films
1991 drama films
Chinese drama films
1990s Mandarin-language films